Barry Sumpter (born November 11, 1965, in Brooklyn, Illinois) is a retired American professional basketball player A 6'11" forward-center, Sumpter attended Lovejoy high school where he excelled at basketball.

Following his college career at University of Louisville and Austin Peay State University, Sumpter was selected by the San Antonio Spurs in the 3rd round (56th overall) of the 1988 NBA Draft. He later signed with the Los Angeles Clippers where he played is only career NBA game on April 2, 1989, against the Detroit Pistons. He later played in the Continental Basketball Association, including for the Quad City Thunder where he set the team records for blocked shots (338), rebounds (2,503), and career games played (385). In 1998, he won the CBA championship with the Thunder.

References

External links
College & NBA stats @ databasebasketball.com
Quad City Thunder Records

1965 births
Living people
American men's basketball players
Austin Peay Governors men's basketball players
Basketball players from Illinois
Centers (basketball)
Fargo-Moorhead Fever players
Los Angeles Clippers players
Louisville Cardinals men's basketball players
McDonald's High School All-Americans
Oklahoma City Cavalry players
Parade High School All-Americans (boys' basketball)
People from Brooklyn, Illinois
Power forwards (basketball)
Quad City Thunder players
San Antonio Spurs draft picks